Persada (stands for Persatuan Sepakbola Sumba Barat Daya) is a Indonesian football team based in Southwest Sumba Regency, East Nusa Tenggara. They currently competes in the Liga 3.

References

External links

Football clubs in Indonesia
Football clubs in East Nusa Tenggara